The 1979 Tour de Romandie was the 33rd edition of the Tour de Romandie cycle race and was held from 8 May to 13 May 1979. The race started in Neuchâtel and finished in Geneva. The race was won by Giuseppe Saronni.

General classification

References

1979
Tour de Romandie
May 1979 sports events in Europe
1979 Super Prestige Pernod